"Temple" is a song by American rock band Kings of Leon, issued as the third single from the band's sixth studio album Mechanical Bull.

Critical reception
The song has received positive reception from critics. Simon Harper of UK magazine Clash positively compared the song to that of work from The Cure. Leonie Cooper of NME, while having given the parent album a middling rating, highlighted the song as being "the best thing [the band has] written in five years".

Live performances
The band has performed the song on Jimmy Kimmel Live!, Late Night with Jimmy Fallon and Saturday Night Live.

Charts

Release history

References

External links
 

2013 singles
2013 songs
Kings of Leon songs
RCA Records singles
Songs written by Caleb Followill
Songs written by Jared Followill
Songs written by Matthew Followill
Songs written by Nathan Followill